Yan Yu may refer to:

 Yan Yu (Yan Baihu's brother) (嚴輿) (died 196), younger brother of the Han dynasty warlord Yan Baihu
 Yan Yu (Three Kingdoms) (閻宇), general of the Shu Han state in the Three Kingdoms period
 Yan Yu (poetry theorist), poet of the Southern Song dynasty
 Yan Yu (diplomat), Korean diplomat and ambassador
 "Beautiful Encounter (Yan Yu)", a 2009 song by Elva Hsiao from the album Diamond Candy

See also
 Yuyan (disambiguation)